American Film Renaissance (AFR) was a non-profit film institute best known for its conservative/libertarian film festivals, held annually in different locations.

Mission
AFR's mission was to celebrate "timeless American values by producing, showcasing and distributing films that promoted freedom (including free speech, free enterprise, and freedom of worship), rugged individualism, and triumph of the human spirit".  AFR was founded by small business owner Jim Hubbard and his attorney wife Ellen Hubbard.  The first AFR festival premiered in September, 2004 in Dallas, Texas and received extensive press coverage.  Aside from Dallas, AFR also hosted festivals in Hollywood, California, Traverse City, Michigan and Washington, D.C.  At its festivals, AFR screened feature films such as The World's Fastest Indian starring Anthony Hopkins and documentaries such as The Bituminous Coal Queens of Pennsylvania produced by Patricia Heaton.  Films at AFR film festivals were screened at several well-known venues such as the Grauman's Chinese Theatre in Los Angeles and The John F. Kennedy Center for the Performing Arts in Washington.  Celebrities who appeared at AFR events included Heaton, Gary Sinise, Robert Davi, and Tony Shalhoub.

In 2007, AFR expanded into documentary film production with their first film Museum of Government Waste and in 2008, into filmmaker training programs.  One notable AFR training graduate was Rich Middlemas, producer of the 2011 Academy Award Winner for Best Documentary, Undefeated.

See also

 Motion Picture Alliance for the Preservation of American Ideals

References

External links
 Official website
 Organizational Profile  – National Center for Charitable Statistics (Urban Institute)

Film festivals in the United States
Libertarian organizations based in the United States